The 2021 Cavan Intermediate Football Championship was the 57th edition of Cavan GAA's premier Gaelic football tournament for intermediate graded clubs in County Cavan, Ireland. The tournament consists of 14 teams, with the winner representing Cavan in the Ulster Intermediate Club Football Championship.

The championship starts with a league stage and then progresses to a knock out stage.

Butlersbridge defeated Ballyhaise in the final to claim their first Intermediate title.

Team Changes
The following teams have changed division since the 2020 championship season.

To Championship
Promoted from 2020 Cavan Junior Football Championship
  Templeport  –  (Junior Champions)

From Championship
Promoted to 2021 Cavan Senior Football Championship
  Ballinagh  –  (Intermediate Champions)

Withdrew
  Ramor United B

League stage

Round 1

Round 2

Round 3

Round 4

Knock-Out Stage

Quarter-finals

Semi-finals

Final

Relegation play-offs

References

External links
 Official Cavan GAA Website

Cavan Intermediate
Cavan GAA Football championships